Le géant de la gaffe, written and drawn by Franquin, is the tenth album of the original Gaston Lagaffe series. It is composed of 52 strips previously published in Spirou. It was published in 1972 by Dupuis.

Story
Le géant de la gaffe is the first album in which Franquin inserts eccentric signatures. Monsieur De Mesmaeker is less present than in previous albums.

Inventions
alcohol detector: device to measure the rate of alcohol in the blood, it must not be exposed to fire
electric umbrella: umbrella that can open and close pushing on the same button
coffee-maker: personal invention that delivers very strong coffee
graft for cactus: graft which allow cactuses to grow extremely rapidly
spring-wire for phones: wire very elasticated, that may hurt dangerously the user
soap: soap that blows a lot of bubbles once it is in contact with water
automatic door: door that open automatically thanks to photoelectric cells
heating system: system for cars installed which conducts the gas by a chimney
spray for carburetor: an effective but polluting system
hand-armchair : very comfortable armchair designed as a giant hand
monorail: device linked to rails set in the ceiling to get around easily in the offices
monorail monoplace: the same monorail, modified  -because being too low, it could hurt people- but with a default in the brake system

Background
This album is the last which is made up of 52 pages.

References

 Gaston Lagaffe classic series on the official website
 Publication in Spirou on bdoubliées.com.

External links
Official website 

1972 graphic novels
Comics by André Franquin